James Batchelor may refer to:
 James Batchelor (footballer) (1895–1951), English footballer
 James Batchelor (rugby league) (born 1998), English rugby league footballer